Santos Futebol Clube, commonly known as Santos da Paraíba, is a Brazilian football club based in João Pessoa, Paraíba state.  Its colors are the same as those of its famous homonym (black and white).

History
The club was founded on September 9, 1949. Santos won the Campeonato Paraibano Second Level in 2010.

Achievements
 Campeonato Paraibano Second Level:
 Winners (1): 1996

Stadium

Santos Futebol Clube play their home games at Almeidão. The stadium has a maximum capacity of 40,000 people.

References

Association football clubs established in 1949
Football clubs in Paraíba
1949 establishments in Brazil